Danny and the Dinosaur is a children's picture book by Syd Hoff, first published by Harper & Brothers in 1958. It has sold over ten million copies and has been translated into a dozen languages. The book inspired six other sequels by Syd Hoff. Danny and the Dinosaur is designated as an I Can Read! Book.

The idea for Danny and the Dinosaur came when Hoff began drawing for one of his daughters, who, at the time, was going through a physical therapy.

The story spawned an animated short in 1990 by Weston Woods.

Plot
The story opens up with a young boy named Danny going to a science museum. He sees Indians, bears, Eskimos, guns, and swords. Finally, he immediately gets drawn to the dinosaur exhibit and would be delighted to find a living dinosaur. The dinosaurs in the dinosaur exhibit are really models and not real. Then he says he thinks it would be nice to play with one. One of the dinosaurs come up to Danny and says, "And I think it would be nice to play with you". Both agree to play with each other, and Danny rides out of the museum on the dinosaur's neck.

The dinosaur is well-intentioned throughout the story, for he helps a lady cross the street, takes Danny across a river and lets the children use him as a slide. The dinosaur is also a celebrity, as the illustrations show hundreds of people leave the zoo to see Danny and the dinosaur.

Pretty soon, Danny meets with his friends. The other children get to ride the dinosaur too. Then, Danny and the children all play with the dinosaur throughout the day. Finally, they end with a game called hide and seek. The children and the dinosaur take turns hiding. The children find the dinosaur several times, but then there is no place else for him to hide in the neighborhood. In the last part of the game, Danny hatches an idea to make the game slightly harder. His idea (for the dinosaur) is to "pretend to not find him". When the dinosaur finds the children, he says, "Here I am!". Then Danny and his friends all cheer that the dinosaur wins. Danny says, "The dinosaur wins! We couldn’t find him! He fooled us! Hurray for the dinosaur!".

At the end of the story, all the other children return home at sunset. Finally, when Danny and the dinosaur are alone, he says goodbye to Danny. When Danny wants to keep the dinosaur as a pet, the dinosaur says "No" to Danny and explains his reason the museum needs him. After Danny says goodbye, he (who knows that all good things come to an end) knows that he and the dinosaur can some time meet again and play another day.

After watching until the long tail is out of sight, Danny went home alone. On his way home, Danny thinks about one of the things first stated in the story. He really wants to keep the dinosaur for a pet, but realizes that it would be too big to live in a house. However, Danny concludes that he and the dinosaur "did have a wonderful day".

Sequels 

The book spawned thirteen other sequels (if counting I Can Read! books, paperback/hardcover books, and sticker books). However, the first few sequels (Happy Birthday Danny and the Dinosaur, Danny and the Dinosaur Go to Camp, Danny and the Dinosaur: Too Tall, Danny and the Dinosaur and the New Puppy, Danny and the Dinosaur and the Girl Next Door, Dany and the Dinosaur School Days, Danny and the Dinosaur Mind Their Manners, Danny and the Dinosaur and the Sand Castle Contest, and Danny and the Dinosaur Ride a Bike) like the original book (Danny and the Dinosaur) were designated as an I Can Read! book.

 Happy Birthday, Danny and the Dinosaur (1985)
 Danny and the Dinosaur Go to Camp (1996)
 Danny and the Dinosaur: Too Tall (2014)
 Danny and the Dinosaur and the New Puppy (2015)
 Danny and the Dinosaur and the Girl Next Door (2016)
 Danny and the Dinosaur: School Days (2017)
Danny and the Dinosaur: Mind Their Manners
Danny and the Dinosaur and the Sand Castle Contest
Danny and the Dinosaur: Ride a Bike
Danny and the Dinosaur: Happy Halloween
Danny and the Dinosaur: A Very Dino Christmas
Danny and the Dinosaur: First Valentine's Day
Danny and the Dinosaur: Eggs, Eggs, Eggs

Film adaptation
In January 2023, it was reported that the book series will adapt into a feature film with HarperCollins Productions and Legendary Entertainment set to produce.

See also
 Edwina, the Dinosaur Who Didn't Know She Was Extinct, a similar book about a dinosaur

References 

1958 children's books
American picture books
Children's novels about dinosaurs
Harper & Brothers books